T. N. Prathapan is an Indian National Congress politician from Thrissur who currently serves as Member of parliament from Thrissur (Lok Sabha constituency) and was a Member of the Legislative Assembly of Kodungallur Assembly Constituency to Kerala Legislative Assembly in 2011. He was previously elected to K.L.A. in 2001 and 2006 from Nattika Assembly Constituency.

He contested the 2019 Indian general election from Kerala as a candidate of Indian National Congress in Thrissur constituency and was elected as the MP.

References

External links

Indian National Congress politicians from Kerala
Malayali politicians
People from Thrissur district
Living people
1960 births
Kerala MLAs 2001–2006
Kerala MLAs 2006–2011
Kerala MLAs 2011–2016
India MPs 2019–present